The Orlen Warsaw Marathon is an annual road running event over the marathon distance that takes place in April on the streets of Warsaw, Poland. The event was established in 2013 and has Polish oil company PKN Orlen as its title sponsor. It was the second annual marathon race for the city, following on from the success of the Warsaw Marathon, which has been held in the city, generally in September, since 1979.

By its fourth edition, the event received IAAF Silver Label status and featured in excess of 8000 entrants into the marathon race. That year's race also saw the first Polish winner in the form of men's champion Artur Kozłowski.

The course records of 2:06:55 hours, set by Tadese Tola in 2014, and 2:26:25 hours, set by Fatuma Sado in 2015, are all-comers records – the fastest ever recorded in Poland for the marathon distance.

The marathon was not held in 2020.

Winners
Key:
  Course record
  National championship race

Multiple wins

By country

Notes

See also 
Warsaw Marathon
Cracovia Marathon
Poznań Marathon
Sport in Poland

References

External links

Marathon
Marathons in Poland
Recurring sporting events established in 2013
April sporting events
Spring (season) events in Poland